Barraba Shire was a local government area located in the New England region of New South Wales, Australia, about  north of Tamworth via Fossickers Way.

History
In 1897, a progress association was brought into being by local residents to advocate for the area and to manage infrastructure. With the passage of the Local Government Act 1906, which established shires all over New South Wales, the Barraba Shire was gazetted on 6 March 1906. As the town met the requirements for municipality status, it was separately gazetted as the Barraba Municipality on 19 May 1906. S. J. Lillis was elected the municipality's first mayor, while John Morrow became the first Barraba Shire president.

On 1 November 1953, the Barraba Municipality was abolished and the town came under the Shire's authority.

On 17 March 2004, Barraba Shire was abolished.  (41%) of its area and 340 people in the Shire's north were transferred to the new Gwydir Shire, composed otherwise of the former Yallaroi and Bingara Shires. The rest, including the town of Barraba, was transferred to the new Tamworth Regional Council, formed from the former City of Tamworth and the Shires of Manilla, Nundle and most of Parry.

Towns
 Barraba
 Banoon
 Cobbadah †
 Gulf Creek †
 Gundamulda †
 Ironbark
 Lindesay †
 Longarm
 Mayvale
 Red Hill
 Upper Horton †
 Woodsreef

† Transferred to Gwydir upon abolition.

Population

References

Former local government areas of New South Wales
New England (New South Wales)